Kazimierz Żurowski (12 August 1909 in Zagórz – 19 March 1987 in Gniezno) was a Polish archaeologist. He was a professor at Nicolaus Copernicus University in Toruń, and researcher of a Bronze Age and early Middle Ages. Author of book Gniezno, pierwsza stolica Polski (Polish for Gniezno, the first capital of Poland).

References
 

1909 births
1987 deaths
People from Sanok County
20th-century Polish archaeologists
Academic staff of Nicolaus Copernicus University in Toruń